Ibacus ciliatus is a species of slipper lobster from the north-west Pacific Ocean.

Description and life cycle
It is typically a uniform reddish brown in colour; the tail fan (uropods and telson) can be a browner or a yellower hue. I. ciliatus is very similar to Ibacus pubescens, and can only be distinguished by the lack of pubescence (hairiness) on the carapace, and by the number of teeth along the edges of the carapace; in I. ciliatus there are typically 11 (occasionally 10 or 12), while in I. pubescens there are typically 12 (ranging from 11 to 14).

The larvae of I. ciliatus are the typical phyllosoma larvae found in all slipper lobsters and spiny lobsters.

Distribution and ecology
Ibacus ciliatus occurs in the western Pacific Ocean from the Philippines to the Korean Peninsula and southern Japan (south of Niigata on the west coast and Tokyo Bay on the east coast). It is the only species of Ibacus not known to occur around the coast of Australia.

Fishery and conservation
Records of a fishery for I. ciliatus reach back to 1830, when Heinrich Bürger noted that it was on sale daily in the fish markets around Nagasaki. It is now harvested throughout its range, although there is little data on the quantities being caught. Due to the limited knowledge of the species, it has been assessed as Data Deficient on the IUCN Red List.

Taxonomy
His holotype was deposited at the Rijksmuseum van Natuurlijke Historie in the Netherlands. It was transferred to the genus Ibacus in 1841 by Wilhem de Haan. A former subspecies of I. ciliatus, "I. ciliatus pubescens", is now accorded the rank of full species, as Ibacus pubescens.

The English vernacular name preferred by the Food and Agriculture Organization (FAO) is "Japanese fan lobster".

References

Achelata
Crustaceans described in 1824
Edible crustaceans